Mary S. Rogeness (born May 18, 1941 in Kansas City, Kansas) is an American politician who represented the 2nd Hampden district in the Massachusetts House of Representatives from 1991–2009 and was a member of the Longmeadow School Committee from 1982–1988. She was first elected by defeating Mary Gail Cokkineas.

From 1999–2003 she was the Assistant Minority Whip and from 2003–2009 she was Assistant Minority Leader.

References

1941 births
Republican Party members of the Massachusetts House of Representatives
People from Longmeadow, Massachusetts
Carleton College alumni
Living people
Women state legislators in Massachusetts